Eisenberg is a town in Thuringia, Germany. It is the capital of the district Saale-Holzland.

Neighboring municipalities are Jena ( in west) and Gera ( in south east). West of Eisenberg runs the motorway A 9 from Berlin to Munich. A tradition in Eisenberg on Christmas Eve is that the people of the city meet at the market place by 6 to listen to live Christmas music from the tower of the city hall - played by the brass choir of the Lutheran parish.

The main attraction of the town is the baroque Castle Church, built in 1692 by Christian, Duke of Saxe-Eisenberg.

Personalities

Sons and daughters of the city 

 Johann Michael Heineccius (1674–1722), Lutheran clergyman and historian
 Johann Gottlieb Heineccius (1681–1741), professor of law and philosophy
 Karl Christian Friedrich Krause (1781–1832), philosopher
 Bruno Bauer (1809–1882), philosopher
 Prince Moritz of Saxe-Altenburg (1829–1907), Prussian General of the Cavalry
 Gerhard Buchwald (1920–2009), physician
 Gunther Emmerlich (born 1944), singer and entertainer

Other personalities 
 Christian of Saxony-Eisenberg (1653–1707), the only Duke of Saxony-Eisenberg
 Immanuel Johann Gerhard Scheller (1735–1803), an old philologist and lexicographer, studied at the Gymnasium in Eisenberg between 1747 and 1752
 Charlotte Amalie von Sachsen-Meiningen (Duchess of Saxony-Gotha-Altenburg) lived for several years in Eisenberg
 Georg von Sachsen-Altenburg (1796–1853), Duke of Saxony-Altenburg, resided alternately in Altenburg and Eisenberg
 Otto Hammann (1852–1928), jurist, studied at the Gymnasium in Eisenberg
 Ernst II, Duke of Saxe-Altenburg (1871–1955), Duke of Saxony-Altenburg, attended the Christian-School in Eisenberg between 1886 and 1889
 Peter Landau (born 1935), legal scientist, went to school in Eisenberg

References

External links
Information about the Castle Church: Ev.-Luth. Kirchgemeinde Eisenberg.

Towns in Thuringia
Saale-Holzland-Kreis
Duchy of Saxe-Altenburg